Alan Kim Fowlkes (born August 8, 1958) is a retired professional baseball player who played two seasons for the San Francisco Giants and California Angels of Major League Baseball.

External links
, or Retrosheet, or Pura Pelota

1958 births
Living people
American expatriate baseball players in Canada
American expatriate baseball players in Mexico
Baseball players from California
Cal Poly Pomona Broncos baseball players
California Angels players
California State Polytechnic University, Pomona alumni
Charlotte O's players 
Colorado Springs Sky Sox players
Diablos Rojos del México players
Edmonton Trappers players
Fresno Giants players
Great Falls Giants players
Iowa Cubs players
Jacksonville Expos players
Major League Baseball pitchers
Mexican League baseball pitchers
People from Brawley, California
Phoenix Giants players
Reno Silver Sox players
Rochester Red Wings players
San Francisco Giants players
Shreveport Captains players
Tigres de Aragua players
American expatriate baseball players in Venezuela